Ouled Chebel is a town and commune in Algiers Province, Algeria. As of 1998, the commune had a total population of 16,335.

Notable people

See also

Communes of Algeria

References

Communes of Algiers Province
Cities in Algeria
Algeria